Chersky (masculine), Cherskaya (feminine), or Cherskoye (neuter) may refer to:
Jan Czerski (1845–1892), also known as Ivan Chersky, Polish scientist and explorer
Chersky Urban Settlement, a municipal formation into which the Settlement of Chersky in Nizhnekolymsky District of the Sakha Republic, Russia is incorporated
Chersky (inhabited locality) (Cherskaya, Cherskoye), several inhabited localities in Russia
Chersky Airport, in the Sakha Republic, Russia
Chersky, alternative name of the Northeast Science Station, an Arctic research station in Russia
Chersky Range, a mountain chain in northeastern Siberia
Chersky Range (Transbaikalia)
Mount Chersky, the highest peak of the Baikal Mountains
Chersky Peak, a mountain in Irkutsk Oblast